The table below lists the census metropolitan areas and agglomerations in Canada by population, using data from the 2021 Canadian census and the 2016 Canadian census. Each entry is identified as a census metropolitan area (CMA) or a census agglomeration (CA) as defined by Statistics Canada.

Note that a city's metropolitan area in colloquial or administrative terms may be different from its CMA as defined by Statistics Canada, resulting in differing populations. Such is the case with the Greater Toronto Area, where its metro population is notably higher than its CMA population due to its inclusion of the neighbouring Oshawa CMA to the east and the Burlington portion of the neighbouring Hamilton CMA to the west.

In 2021, 27,465,137 people (71.9% of Canada's population) lived in a CMA, while 4,596,279 (12.0%) lived in a CA.

Recent growth 
Between 2016 and 2021, the five CMAs with the highest percentage growth were located in British Columbia and Southern Ontario. The five CMAs with the lowest percentage growth were in Quebec, Alberta, Northern Ontario and Newfoundland and Labrador. There were no CMAs for which negative growth was recorded in the 2021 census. The five CAs that grew the fastest were in British Columbia, Southern Ontario, and Alberta, while the five CAs whose population declined the most were in New Brunswick, Saskatchewan, Northern British Columbia, Manitoba and Newfoundland and Labrador. 

Between 2011 and 2016, the six fastest-growing CMAs by percentage growth were located in Western Canada, with Alberta's two CMAs, Calgary and Edmonton, leading the country. Saskatoon, Regina, and Lethbridge rounded out the top five in the country and each grew by at least 10%. Of the remaining 30 CMAs, population growth was recorded in all but two of them. Those that experienced population decline were Brantford and Saint John. Ten of the fifteen fastest-growing CAs in Canada between the two most recent censuses were located in Alberta. The other five were located in British Columbia with two, and Manitoba, Ontario and Yukon each with one. 

Between 2006 and 2011, twenty-four CAs experienced population decline. The fifteen CAs that experienced the greatest population decline were located in British Columbia (two), Manitoba (one), New Brunswick (one), Nova Scotia (three), Ontario (four) and Quebec (four). Okotoks experienced the greatest increase while Thompson experienced the greatest decline.

List 

Canada had 41 CMAs and 110 CAs at the 2021 census. The number of CMAs increased from 35 in 2016 by the promotion of the Nanaimo, Kamloops, Chilliwack, Fredericton, Drummondville and Red Deer CAs. Overall, between promotion to CMA, absorption, and dissolution, the number of CAs decreased by seven. Amos was reinstated as a CA and Ladysmith, Trail and Essa were added as new CAs. The Carleton Place and Arnprior CAs were dissolved as they were added to the Ottawa–Gatineau CMA, the Leamington CA was dissolved as it was added to the Windsor CMA, and the Cold Lake and Bay Roberts CAs were dissolved as their urban population decreased below 10,000. 2016 rankings in the chart below are based on 2021 boundaries and exclude the five CAs dissolved in 2021 but include the four new/reinstated CAs.

Canada had 35 CMAs and 117 CAs at the 2016 census. The number of CMAs increased from 33 in 2011 by promoting the Belleville and Lethbridge CAs. The number of CAs increased from 113 through the creation of eight new CAs – Arnprior, Carleton Place, Gander, Nelson, Sainte-Marie, Wasaga Beach, Weyburn and Winkler – the demotion of two CAs – Amos and Temiskaming Shores – and the promotion of Belleville and Lethbridge to CMAs.

See also 

 List of Canadian census agglomerations by province or territory
 List of census agglomerations in Canada
 List of the largest municipalities in Canada by population
 List of the largest population centres in Canada
 Population of Canada by year

References

External links 
Population estimates of census metropolitan areas, Statistics Canada

 
Metropolitan areas